Jermaine Robinson (born April 10, 1989) is a professional gridiron football defensive back. He played college football at Toledo.

College career
Robinson played for Toledo from 2009 to 2012.

Professional career
Robinson played in four games for the Sioux Falls Storm in 2013. Robinson signed with the Ottawa Redblacks in March 2014. Robinson signed with the Hamilton Tiger-Cats on September 20, 2016. On May 31, 2017, Robinson signed with the Sioux Falls Storm. He participated in The Spring League in 2017.

References

External links
 Toledo profile
 Ottawa Redblacks profile
 

1989 births
Living people
American football defensive backs
American players of Canadian football
Canadian football defensive backs
Toledo Rockets football players
Ottawa Redblacks players
Sioux Falls Storm players
Hamilton Tiger-Cats players
Players of American football from Pittsburgh
Players of Canadian football from Pittsburgh
The Spring League players
Montreal Alouettes players